HMS Plumper was launched in 1807. She captured three small American privateers early in the War of 1812 but was wrecked in December 1812.

Career
Lieutenant William Frissell commissioned Plumper in 1808 and commanded her until 1810. He was in command when Plumper participated in the capture of Guadeloupe in January and February 1810. In 1847 the Admiralty awarded the Naval General Service Medal with clasp "Guadaloupe" to all surviving participants of the campaign.

On 22 January 1811 Lloyd's List (LL) reported incorrectly that Plumper had been lost in the st Lawrence River while sailing from Halifax to Quebec.

From 1812 her commander was Lieutenant James Bray.

 and Plumper captured the privateer schooner Fair Trader on 16 July 1812 in the Bay of Fundy. Fair Trader was armed with one gun and had a 20-man crew.

Also around the middle of July an American privateer captured William, of Bristol, Hare, master, off Cape Sable. Indian recaptured William and took her into Halifax. Whether William was one of Fair Traders prizes or not is an open question. A report in LL stated that Indian had captured Fair Trader, Argus, and a third American privateer.

LL reported that Indian and Plumper had captured six American privateers. Separately, it reported that Plumper had recaptured Fanny, from Glasgow, which the American privateer Teazer had captured. Fanny, Colston, master, had been sailing from Clyde to New Brunswick. Plumper sent her into Halifax.

On 6 July Plumper captured Samuel, Stanton, master, which had been sailing from Oporto. Plumper took out $5300 and permitted Samuel to proceed. Samuel arrived at Boston on 11 July.

On 17 July Plumper captured the American privateer schooner Argus. Argus was armed with one gun and had a crew of 23 men.

The next day Plumper captured the American privateer Friendship, of one gun and eight men.

LL reported on 15 September 1812 that Plumper had detained the sloop Margaret, from Liverpool, but that an American privateer had retaken Margaret and taken her into Portland.

Fate
Plumper was wrecked on 5 December 1812 while en route to Halifax with £70,000 in specie for the purchase of arms for the military in St John. She struck on the ledges off Dipper Harbour in the Bay of Fundy and sank immediately with the loss of the specie and 42 of the 60 people on board, consisting both of crew and passengers. Bray and all his officers were among the men drowned.

LL reported the loss on 8 January 1813.

Notes, citations, and references
Notes

Citations

References
 
 
 
 

 

1807 ships
Brigs of the Royal Navy
Maritime incidents in 1810
Maritime incidents in 1812